The MT Bonsu was a 16,000 tonne oil storage vessel that operated off the coast of Ghana in the Saltpond Oil Field. She was commissioned for operations in the field in 2008. Beached and scrapped at Aliaga, Turkey, 21/10/15.

References

Petroleum industry in Ghana
Oil tankers
1982 ships